Show of Hands is a 2008 romantic comedy-drama film written and directed by Anthony McCarten. It stars Melanie Lynskey, Craig Hall, Stephen Lovatt and Matt Whelan.

Inspired by true events, the story concerns an endurance competition where the person who can keep their hand on a new car the longest wins the car.

Filming took place in New Plymouth, New Zealand between November and December 2007. The film premiered at the Montreal World Film Festival on 28 August 2008, and was released theatrically in New Zealand on 13 November that same year.

References

External links
 

New Zealand comedy-drama films
2008 films
Films with screenplays by Anthony McCarten
2000s English-language films